A princely state (also called native state or Indian state) was a nominally sovereign entity of the British Indian Empire that was not directly governed by the British, but rather by an Indian ruler under a form of indirect rule, subject to a subsidiary alliance and the suzerainty or paramountcy of the British crown.

In July 1946, Jawaharlal Nehru pointedly observed that no princely state could prevail militarily against the army of independent India. In January 1947, Nehru said that independent India would not accept the divine right of kings. In May 1947, he declared that any princely state which refused to join the Constituent Assembly would be treated as an enemy state. There were officially 565 princely states when India and Pakistan became independent in 1947, but the great majority had contracted with the viceroy to provide public services and tax collection. Only 21 had actual state governments, and only four were large (Hyderabad State, Mysore State, Jammu and Kashmir State, and Baroda State). They acceded to one of the two new independent nations between 1947 and 1949. All the princes were eventually pensioned off.

At the time of the British withdrawal, 565 princely states were officially recognised in the Indian subcontinent, apart from thousands of zamindari estates and jagirs. In 1947, princely states covered 40% of the area of pre-independence India and constituted 23% of its population. The most important states had their own British political residencies: Hyderabad of the Nizams, Mysore and Travancore in the South, Jammu and Kashmir,  Sikkim in the Himalayas, and Indore in Central India. The most prominent among those – roughly a quarter of the total – had the status of a salute state, one whose ruler was entitled to a set number of gun salutes on ceremonial occasions.

In 1941, Hyderabad had a population of over 16 million, while Jammu and Kashmir had a population of slightly over 4 million.

The era of the princely states effectively ended with Indian independence in 1947; by 1950, almost all of the principalities had acceded to either India or Pakistan. The accession process was largely peaceful, except in the cases of Jammu and Kashmir (whose ruler decided to accede to India following an invasion by Pakistan-based forces, resulting in a long-standing dispute between the two countries), Hyderabad State (whose ruler opted for independence in 1947, followed a year later by the invasion and annexation of the state by India), Junagarh and its vassal Bantva Manavadar (whose rulers acceded to Pakistan, but were annexed by India), and Kalat (whose ruler declared independence in 1947, followed in 1948 by the state's accession to Pakistan).

As per the terms of accession, the erstwhile Indian princes received privy purses (government allowances), and initially retained their statuses, privileges, and autonomy in internal matters during a transitional period which lasted until 1956. During this time, the former princely states were merged into unions, each of which was headed by a former ruling prince with the title of Rajpramukh (ruling chief), equivalent to a state governor. In 1956, the position of Rajpramukh was abolished and the federations dissolved, the former principalities becoming part of Indian states. The states which acceded to Pakistan retained their status until the promulgation of a new constitution in 1956, when most became part of the province of West Pakistan; a few of the former states retained their autonomy until 1969 when they were fully integrated into Pakistan. The Indian government abolished the privy purses in 1971, followed by the government of Pakistan in 1972.

History

Though principalities and chiefdoms existed on the Indian subcontinent from at least the Iron Age, the history of princely states on the Indian subcontinent dates to at least the fifth or sixth century C.E., during the rise of the middle kingdoms of India following the collapse of the Gupta Empire. Many of the future ruling clan groups – notably the Rajputs – began to emerge during this period; by the 13th–14th centuries, many of the Rajput clans had firmly established semi-independent principalities in the north-west, along with several in the north-east. The widespread expansion of Islam during this time brought many principalities into tributary relations with Islamic sultanates, notably with the Mughal Empire. In the south, however, the Hindu Vijayanagara Empire remained dominant until the mid-17th century; among its tributaries was the future Mysore Kingdom.

The Turco-Mongol Mughal Empire brought a majority of the existing Indian kingdoms and principalities under its suzerainty by the 17th century, beginning with its foundation in the early 16th century. Despite the difference in religion, the Mughal emperors also contracted a series of marriages with Rajput princesses, and Rajput forces and generals became an important part of their military power. The advent of Sikhism resulted in the creation of the Sikh Empire in the north by the early 18th century, by which time the Mughal Empire was in full decline. The Muslim nawabs had begun as appointed governors of territories conquered by the Mughals, in theory a non-hereditary title, with obligations to pay a large share of their revenues to the emperor. As the emperors became too weak to enforce their power, the nawabs stopped paying, and passed on their realms to their sons.

At the same time, the Marathas carved out their own states to form the Maratha Empire. Through the 18th century, former Mughal governors formed their own independent states. In the north-west, some of those – such as Tonk – allied themselves with various groups, including the Marathas and the Durrani Empire, itself formed in 1747 from a loose agglomeration of tribal chiefdoms that composed former Mughal territories. In the south, the principalities of Hyderabad and Arcot were fully established by the 1760s, though they nominally remained vassals of the Mughal emperor.

The largest Muslim-ruled state was Hyderabad State, which was also the first to sign a treaty with the British, in 1798, when it was caught between them and the Marathas. The treaties of 1817 and 1818 concluding the decisive Third Anglo-Maratha War left the remaining Maratha territories as princely states, with treaties with the British, and the Rajput states resumed their subordinate status, now with the British.

British relationship with the princely states
India under the British Raj (the "Indian Empire") consisted of two types of territory: British India and the native states or princely states. In its Interpretation Act 1889, the British Parliament adopted the following definitions:

(4.) The expression "British India" shall mean all territories and places within Her Majesty's dominions which are for the time being governed by Her Majesty through the Governor-General of India or through any governor or other officer subordinate to the Governor-General of India.
(5.) The expression "India" shall mean British India together with any territories of any native prince or chief under the suzerainty of Her Majesty exercised through the Governor-General of India, or through any governor or other officer subordinate to the Governor-General of India.

In general the term "British India" had been used (and is still used) also to refer to the regions under the rule of the East India Company in India from 1774 to 1858.

The British Crown's suzerainty over 175 princely states, generally the largest and most important, was exercised in the name of the British Crown by the central government of British India under the Viceroy; the remaining approximately 400 states were influenced by Agents answerable to the provincial governments of British India under a governor, lieutenant-governor, or chief commissioner. A clear distinction between "dominion" and "suzerainty" was supplied by the jurisdiction of the courts of law: the law of British India rested upon the legislation enacted by the British Parliament, and the legislative powers those laws vested in the various governments of British India, both central and local; in contrast, the courts of the princely states existed under the authority of the respective rulers of those states.

Princely status and titles

The Indian rulers bore various titles – including Chhatrapati (exclusively used by the three Bhonsle dynasty of the Marathas) ("emperor"), Maharaja or Raja ("king"), Sultan, Nawab, Emir, Raje, Nizam, Wadiyar (used only by the Maharajas of Mysore, meaning "lord"), Agniraj Maharaj for the rulers of Bhaddaiyan Raj, Chogyal, Nawab ("governor"), Nayak, Wāli, Inamdar, Saranjamdar and many others. Whatever the literal meaning and traditional prestige of the ruler's actual title, the British government translated them all as "prince", to avoid the implication that the native rulers could be "kings" with status equal to that of the British monarch.

More prestigious Hindu rulers (mostly existing before the Mughal Empire, or having split from such old states) often used the title "Raja", Raje" or a variant such as Rai, Rana, "Rao", "Rawat" or Rawal. Also in this 'class' were several Thakurs or Thai ores and a few particular titles, such as Sardar, Mankari (or Mānkari/Maankari), Deshmukh, Sar Desai, Istamuradar, Saranjamdar, Raja Inamdar etc.

The most prestigious Hindu rulers usually had the prefix "maha" ("great", compare for example Grand Duke) in their titles, as in Maharaja, Maharana, Maharao, etc. This was used in many princely states including Mewar, Travancore and Cochin. The state of Travancore also had queens regent styled Maharani, applied only to sister of king in Kerala.

There were also compound titles, such as (Maha)rajadhiraj, Raj-i-rajgan, often relics from an elaborate system of hierarchical titles under the Mughal emperors. For example, the addition of the adjective Bahadur raised the status of the titleholder one level.

Furthermore, most dynasties used a variety of additional titles such as Varma in South India. This should not be confused with various titles and suffixes not specific to princes but used by entire (sub)castes. This is almost analogous to Singh title in North India.

The Sikh princes concentrated at Punjab usually adopted Hindu type titles when attaining princely rank; at a lower level Sardar was used.

Muslim rulers almost all used the title "Nawab" (the Arabic honorific of naib, "deputy", used of the Mughal governors, who became de facto autonomous with the decline of the Mughal Empire), with the prominent exceptions of the Nizam of Hyderabad & Berar, the Wāli/Khan of Kalat and the Wāli of Swat.
Other less usual titles included Darbar Sahib, Dewan, Jam, Mehtar (unique to Chitral) and Mir (from Emir).

Precedence and prestige
However, the actual importance of a princely state cannot be read from the title of its ruler, which was usually granted (or at least recognised) as a favour, often in recognition for loyalty and services rendered to the Mughal Empire. Although some titles were raised once or even repeatedly, there was no automatic updating when a state gained or lost real power. In fact, princely titles were even awarded to holders of domains (mainly jagirs) and even taluqdars and zamindars, which were not states at all. Most of the zamindar who hold the princely titles were in fact erstwhile princely and royal states reduced to zamindari by the British EIC. Various sources give significantly different numbers of states and domains of the various types. Even in general, the definition of titles and domains are clearly not well-established.

In addition to their titles all princely rulers were eligible to be appointed to certain British orders of chivalry associated with India, the Most Exalted Order of the Star of India and the Most Eminent Order of the Indian Empire. Women could be appointed as "Knights" (instead of Dames) of these orders. Rulers entitled to 21-gun and 19-gun salutes were normally appointed to the highest rank, Knight Grand Commander of the Order of the Star of India.

Many Indian princes served in the British Army, the Indian Army, or in local guard or police forces, often rising to high ranks; some even served while on the throne. Many of these were appointed as an Aide de camp, either to the ruling prince of their own house (in the case of relatives of such rulers) or indeed to the British monarchs. Many saw active service, both on the subcontinent and on other fronts, during both World Wars.

Apart from those members of the princely houses who entered military service and who distinguished themselves, a good number of princes received honorary ranks as officers in the British and Indian Armed Forces. Those ranks were conferred based on several factors, including their heritage, lineage, gun-salute (or lack of one) as well as personal character or martial traditions. After the First and Second World Wars, the princely rulers of several of the major states, including Gwalior, Patiala, Nabha, Faridkort, Bikaner, Jaipur, Jodhpur, Jammu and Kashmir and Hyderabad, were given honorary general officer ranks as a result of their states' contributions to the war effort.
 Lieutenant/Captain/Flight Lieutenant or Lieutenant-Commander/Major/Squadron Leader (for junior members of princely houses or for minor princes)
 Commander/Lieutenant-Colonel/Wing Commander or Captain/Colonel/Group Captain (granted to princes of salute states, often to those entitled to 15-guns or more)
 Commodore/Brigadier/Air Commodore (conferred upon princes of salute states entitled to gun salutes of 15-guns or more)
 Major-General/Air Vice-Marshal (conferred upon princes of salute states entitled to 15-guns or more; conferred upon rulers of the major princely states, including Baroda, Kapurthala, Travancore, Bhopal and Mysore)
 Lieutenant-General (conferred upon the rulers of the largest and most prominent princely houses after the First and Second World Wars for their states' contributions to the war effort.)
 General (very rarely awarded; the Maharajas of Gwalior and Jammu & Kashmir were created honorary Generals in the British Army in 1877, the Maharaja of Bikaner was made one in 1937, and the Nizam of Hyderabad in 1941)

It was also not unusual for members of princely houses to be appointed to various colonial offices, often far from their native state, or to enter the diplomatic corps.

Salute states

The gun salute system was used to set unambiguously the precedence of the major rulers in the area in which the British East India Company was active, or generally of the states and their dynasties. As heads of a state, certain princely rulers were entitled to be saluted by the firing of an odd number of guns between three and 21, with a greater number of guns indicating greater prestige. Generally, the number of guns remained the same for all successive rulers of a particular state, but individual princes were sometimes granted additional guns on a personal basis. Furthermore, rulers were sometimes granted additional gun salutes within their own territories only, constituting a semi-promotion. The states of all these rulers (about 120) were known as salute states.

After Indian Independence, the Maharana of Udaipur displaced the Nizam of Hyderabad as the most senior prince in India, because Hyderabad State had not acceded to the new Dominion of India, and the style Highness was extended to all rulers entitled to 9-gun salutes. When the princely states had been integrated into the Indian Union their rulers were promised continued privileges and an income (known as the Privy Purse) for their upkeep. Subsequently, when the Indian government abolished the Privy Purse in 1971, the whole princely order ceased to be recognised under Indian law, although many families continue to retain their social prestige informally; some descendants of the rulers are still prominent in regional or national politics, diplomacy, business and high society.

At the time of Indian independence, only five rulers – the Nizam of Hyderabad, the Maharaja of Mysore, the Maharaja of Jammu and Kashmir state, the Maharaja Gaekwad of Baroda and the Maharaja Scindia of Gwalior – were entitled to a 21-gun salute. Six more – the Nawab of Bhopal, the Maharaja Holkar of Indore, the Maharaja of Bharatpur, the Maharana of Udaipur, the Maharaja of Kolhapur, the Maharaja of Patiala and the Maharaja of Travancore – were entitled to 19-gun salutes. The most senior princely ruler was the Nizam of Hyderabad, who was entitled to the unique style Exalted Highness and 21-gun salute. Other princely rulers entitled to salutes of 11 guns (soon 9 guns too) or more were entitled to the style Highness. No special style was used by rulers entitled to lesser gun salutes.

As paramount ruler, and successor to the Mughals, the British King-Emperor of India, for whom the style of Majesty was reserved, was entitled to an 'imperial' 101-gun salute—in the European tradition also the number of guns fired to announce the birth of an heir (male) to the throne.

Non-salute states

There was no strict correlation between the levels of the titles and the classes of gun salutes, the real measure of precedence, but merely a growing percentage of higher titles in classes with more guns.
As a rule the majority of gun-salute princes had at least nine, with numbers below that usually the prerogative of Arab Sheikhs of the Aden protectorate, also under British protection.

There were many so-called non-salute states of lower prestige. Since the total of salute states was 117 and there were more than 500 princely states, most rulers were not entitled to any gun salute. Not all of these were minor rulers – Surguja State, for example, was both larger and more populous than Karauli State, but the Maharaja of Karauli was entitled to a 17-gun salute and the Maharaja of Surguja was not entitled to any gun salute at all.

A number of princes, in the broadest sense of the term, were not even acknowledged as such. On the other hand, the dynasties of certain defunct states were allowed to keep their princely status – they were known as political pensioners, such as the Nawab of Oudh. There were also certain estates of British India which were rendered as political saranjams, having equal princely status. Though none of these princes were awarded gun salutes, princely titles in this category were recognised as a form of vassals of salute states, and were not even in direct relation with the paramount power.

Largest princely states by area

Doctrine of lapse

A controversial aspect of East India Company rule was the doctrine of lapse, a policy under which lands whose feudal ruler died (or otherwise became unfit to rule) without a male biological heir (as opposed to an adopted son) would become directly controlled by the company and an adopted son would not become the ruler of the princely state. This policy went counter to Indian tradition where, unlike Europe, it was far more the accepted norm for a ruler to appoint his own heir.

The doctrine of lapse was pursued most vigorously by the Governor-General Sir James Ramsay, 10th Earl (later 1st Marquess) of Dalhousie. Dalhousie annexed seven states, including Awadh (Oudh), whose Nawabs he had accused of misrule, and the Maratha states of Nagpur, Jhansi, Satara, Sambalpur, and Thanjavur. Resentment over the annexation of these states turned to indignation when the heirlooms of the Maharajas of Nagpur were auctioned off in Calcutta. Dalhousie's actions contributed to the rising discontent amongst the upper castes which played a large part in the outbreak of the Indian mutiny of 1857. The last Mughal Badshah (emperor), whom many of the mutineers saw as a figurehead to rally around, was deposed following its suppression.

In response to the unpopularity of the doctrine, it was discontinued with the end of Company rule and the British Parliament's assumption of direct power over India.

Imperial governance

By treaty, the British controlled the external affairs of the princely states absolutely. As the states were not British possessions, they retained control over their own internal affairs, subject to a degree of British influence which in many states was substantial.

By the beginning of the 20th century, relations between the British and the four largest states – Hyderabad, Mysore, Jammu and Kashmir, and Baroda – were directly under the control of the governor-general of India, in the person of a British resident. Two agencies, for Rajputana and Central India, oversaw twenty and 148 princely states respectively. The remaining princely states had their own British political officers, or Agents, who answered to the administrators of India's provinces. The agents of five princely states were then under the authority of Madras, 354 under Bombay, 26 of Bengal, two under Assam, 34 under Punjab, fifteen under the Central Provinces and Berar and two under the United Provinces.

The Chamber of Princes (Narender Mandal or Narendra Mandal) was an institution established in 1920 by a royal proclamation of the King-Emperor to provide a forum in which the rulers could voice their needs and aspirations to the government. It survived until the end of the British Raj in 1947.

By the early 1930s, most of the princely states whose agencies were under the authority of India's provinces were organised into new Agencies, answerable directly to the governor-general, on the model of the Central India and Rajputana agencies: the Eastern States Agency, Punjab States Agency, Baluchistan Agency, Deccan States Agency, Madras States Agency and the Northwest Frontier States Agency. The Baroda Residency was combined with the princely states of northern Bombay Presidency into the Baroda, Western India and Gujarat States Agency. Gwalior was separated from the Central India Agency and given its own Resident, and the states of Rampur and Benares, formerly with Agents under the authority of the United Provinces, were placed under the Gwalior Residency in 1936. The princely states of Sandur and Banganapalle in Mysore Presidency were transferred to the agency of the Mysore Resident in 1939.

Principal princely states in 1947
The native states in 1947 included five large states that were in "direct political relations" with the Government of India. For the complete list of princely states in 1947, see List of princely states of India.

In direct relations with the central government

Central India Agency, Gwalior Residency, Baluchistan Agency, Rajputana Agency, Eastern States Agency

Gwalior Residency (two states)

Other states under provincial governments

Madras (5 States)

Bombay (354 States)

Central Provinces (15 States)

Punjab (45 States)

Assam (26 states)

Burma

Burma (52 states)

State military forces

The armies of the Native States were bound by many restrictions that were imposed by subsidiary alliances. They existed mainly for ceremonial use and for internal policing, although certain units designated as Imperial Service Troops, were available for service alongside the regular Indian Army upon request by the British government.

The treaty made with Gwalior in 1844, and the instrument of transfer given to Mysore in 1881, alike base the restriction of the forces of the State upon the broad ground of protection. The former explained in detail that unnecessary armies were embarrassing to the State itself and the cause of disquietude to others: a few months later a striking proof of this was afforded by the army of the Sikh kingdom of Lahore. The British Government has undertaken to protect the dominions of the Native princes from invasion and even from rebellion within: its army is organised for the defence not merely of British India, but of all the possessions under the suzerainty of the King-Emperor.

In addition, other restrictions were imposed:

The treaties with most of the larger States are clear on this point. Posts in the interior must not be fortified, factories for the production of guns and ammunition must not be constructed, nor may the subject of other States be enlisted in the local forces. ... They must allow the forces that defend them to obtain local supplies, to occupy cantonments or positions, and to arrest deserters; and in addition to these services they must recognise the Imperial control of the railways, telegraphs, and postal communications as essential not only to the common welfare but to the common defence.

The Imperial Service Troops were routinely inspected by British army officers and had the same equipment as soldiers in the British Indian Army. Although their numbers were relatively small, the Imperial Service Troops were employed in China and British Somaliland in the first decade of the 20th century, and later saw action in the First World War and Second World War .

Political integration of princely states in 1947 and after

India

At the time of Indian independence on 15 August 1947, India was divided into two sets of territories, the first being the territories of "British India", which were under the direct control of the India Office in London and the governor-general of India, and the second being the "princely states", the territories over which the Crown had suzerainty, but which were under the control of their hereditary rulers. In addition, there were several colonial enclaves controlled by France and Portugal. The integration of these territories into Dominion of India, that had been created by the Indian Independence Act 1947 by the British Parliament, was a declared objective of the Indian National Congress, which the Government of India pursued over the years 1947 to 1949. Through a combination of tactics, Sardar Vallabhbhai Patel and V. P. Menon in the months immediately preceding and following the independence convinced the rulers of almost all of the hundreds of princely states to accede to India. In a speech in January 1948, Vallabhbhai Patel said:

Although this process successfully integrated the vast majority of princely states into India, it was not as successful in relation to a few states, notably the former princely state of Kashmir, whose Maharaja delayed signing the instrument of accession into India until his territories were under the threat of invasion by Pakistan, and the state of Hyderabad, whose ruler decided to remain independent and was subsequently defeated by the Operation Polo invasion.

Having secured their accession, Sardar Patel and V. P. Menon then proceeded, in a step-by-step process, to secure and extend the central government's authority over these states and to transform their administrations until, by 1956, there was little difference between the territories that had formerly been part of British India and those that had been princely states. Simultaneously, the Government of India, through a combination of diplomatic and economic pressure, acquired control over most of the remaining European colonial exclaves on the subcontinent. Fed up with the protracted and stubborn resistance of the Portuguese government; in 1961 the Indian Army invaded and annexed Portuguese India. These territories, like the princely states, were also integrated into the Republic of India.

As the final step, in 1971, the 26th amendment to the Constitution of India withdrew recognition of the princes as rulers, took away their remaining privileges, and abolished the remuneration granted to them by privy purses.

Pakistan

During the period of the British Raj, there were four princely states in Balochistan: Makran, Kharan, Las Bela and Kalat. The first three acceded to Pakistan. However, the ruler of the fourth princely state, the Khan of Kalat Ahmad Yar Khan, declared Kalat's independence as this was one of the options given to all princely states. The state remained independent until it was acceded on 27 March 1948. The signing of the Instrument of Accession by Ahmad Yar Khan, led his brother, Prince Abdul Karim, to revolt against his brother's decision in July 1948, causing an ongoing and still unresolved insurgency.

Bahawalpur from the Punjab Agency joined Pakistan on 5 October 1947. The princely states of the North-West Frontier States Agencies. included the Dir Swat and Chitral Agency and the Deputy Commissioner of Hazara acting as the Political Agent for Amb and Phulra. These states joined Pakistan on independence from the British.

See also

 Flags of Indian princely states
 Political integration of India
 List of princely states of British India (by region) 
 List of Indian monarchs
 Praja Mandal
 Salute state
 Indian feudalism
 Indian honorifics
 Ghatwals and Mulraiyats
 Jagirdar
 List of Maratha dynasties and states
 List of Rajput dynasties and states
 Maratha Empire
 Maratha titles
 Oudh Bequest
 Rajputana
 Zamindar
 Vorstenlanden, princely states in the Netherlands Indies

References

Bibliography
 Bangash, Yaqoob Khan (2016). "A Princely Affair: The Accession and Integration of the Princely States of Pakistan, 1947–1955". Oxford University Press Pakistan. 
Bhagavan, Manu. "Princely States and the Hindu Imaginary: Exploring the Cartography of Hindu Nationalism in Colonial India" Journal of Asian Studies, (Aug 2008) 67#3 pp 881–915 in JSTOR
 Bhagavan, Manu. Sovereign Spheres: Princes, Education and Empire in Colonial India (2003)
 .
 Ernst, W. and B. Pati, eds. India’s Princely States: People, Princes, and Colonialism (2007)
 
 Jeffrey, Robin. People, Princes and Paramount Power: Society and Politics in the Indian Princely States (1979) 396pp
 Kooiman, Dick. Communalism and Indian Princely States: Travancore, Baroda & Hyderabad in the 1930s (2002), 249pp
 
 
 Pochhammer, Wilhelm von India's Road to Nationhood: A Political History of the Subcontinent (1973) ch 57 excerpt

Gazetteers
  online
  online
  online

External links

 
 Exhaustive lists of rulers and heads of government, and some biographies.

 
1721 establishments in India
1949 disestablishments in India
Types of administrative division
Client state
Hindu dynasties
Former British protectorates